The 1901 Georgia Tech football team represented the Georgia Institute of Technology during the 1901 college football season. They were blacklisted by the Southern Intercollegiate Athletic Association amidst charges of professionalism.

Schedule

References

Georgia Tech
Georgia Tech Yellow Jackets football seasons
College football undefeated seasons
Georgia Tech football